Don Kay may refer to:

Don Kay (composer) (born 1933), Tasmanian composer
Don Kay (politician) (died 2007), alderman on the Ottawa City Council

See also
Don Kaye (1938–1975), co-founder of Tactical Studies Rules, the game publishing company